Lynch on Lynch is a book of interviews with David Lynch, conducted, edited, and introduced by Chris Rodley, himself a filmmaker.  The interviews took place between 1993 and 1996.  Each chapter is devoted to a separate film, from his beginnings up to Lost Highway.

It was published by Faber & Faber Limited in London in 1997.  A revised edition	was published by Farrar Straus & Giroux on March 16, 2005 

Table of contents
Acknowledgements, Introduction
 Shadow of a Twisted Hand Across My House: Childhood, memory and painting
 Garden in the City of Industry: From The Bride to The Grandmother
 I See Myself: Eraserhead
 A Bug Dreams of Heaven: Shed Building and The Elephant Man
 Oww God, Mom, the Dog He Bited Me: Photography and Dune
 She Wasn't Fooling Anyone, She Was Hurt and She Was Hurt Bad: Music and Blue Velvet
 Suddenly My House Became a Tree of Sores: A Tale of Twin Peaks
 It's a Great Big Wonderful World: Wild at Heart and Weird on Top
 Ants in My House: Lost Highway
 It's a Great Big World Revisited: The Straight Story
 Billy Finds a Book of Riddles Right in His Own Back Yard: Mulholland Drive
Filmography, Bibliography, A Note on the Editor, Index

External links
 Lynch on Lynch review in Film Quarterly
 Lynch On Lynch reviewed by Dan Czajkowski

Books about film
1997 non-fiction books
Books by David Lynch
Faber and Faber books
Books of interviews